The ACM Computing Classification System (CCS) is a subject classification system for computing devised by the Association for Computing Machinery (ACM). The system is comparable to the Mathematics Subject Classification (MSC) in scope, aims, and structure, being used by the various ACM journals to organize subjects by area.

History
The system has gone through seven revisions, the first version being published in 1964, and revised versions appearing in 1982, 1983, 1987, 1991, 1998, and the now current version in 2012.

Structure
It is hierarchically structured in four levels. For example, one branch of the hierarchy contains:
 Computing methodologies
 Artificial intelligence
 Knowledge representation and reasoning
 Ontology engineering

See also
Computer Science Ontology
Physics and Astronomy Classification Scheme
arXiv, a preprint server allowing submitted papers to be classified using the ACM CCS
Physics Subject Headings

References
 .
 .
 .

External links
 dl.acm.org/ccs is the homepage of the system, including links to four complete versions of the system:
 the 1964 version 
 the 1991 version 
 the 1998 version
 the current 2012 version.
 The ACM Computing Research Repository uses a classification scheme that is much coarser than the ACM subject classification, and does not cover all areas of CS, but is intended to better cover active areas of research. In addition, papers in this repository are classified according to the ACM subject classification.

Computing Classification System
Classification systems
Computer science literature
1964 in computing
Computer-related introductions in 1964
Computing Classification System